Geleh Deh Rud (also Romanized as Geleh Deh Rūd; also known as Geleh Deh and Gelleh Deh) is a village in Soluk Rural District, in the Central District of Hashtrud County, East Azerbaijan Province, Iran. At the 2006 census, its population was 538, in 113 families.

References 

Towns and villages in Hashtrud County